The Astra A-80 is a double-action, semi-automatic pistol at one time produced in Spain by Astra-Unceta y Cia SA.  The design is similar to the SIG Sauer P220 and features a decocking lever.  The A-80 provided the first SIG-styled .45 ACP with a 10-round, double-stacked magazine. Thirty years later, SIG introduced their own version, the P227, in 2013.

Notes

7.65×21mm Parabellum semi-automatic pistols
.38 Super semi-automatic pistols
.45 ACP semi-automatic pistols
9mm Largo firearms
9mm Parabellum semi-automatic pistols
Semi-automatic pistols of Spain